Brian Thomas Grazer (born July 12, 1951) is an American film and television producer and writer. He founded Imagine Entertainment in 1986 with Ron Howard. The films they produced have grossed over $15 billion.  Grazer was personally nominated for four Academy Awards for Splash (1984), Apollo 13 (1995), A Beautiful Mind (2001), and Frost/Nixon (2008).  His films and TV series have been nominated for 47 Academy Awards and 217 Emmy Awards.

In 2002, Grazer won an Oscar for Best Picture for A Beautiful Mind (shared with Ron Howard). In 2007, he was named one of Times "100 Most Influential People in the World".

Early life
Grazer was born in Los Angeles, California, to Arlene Becker Grazer and criminal defense attorney Thomas Grazer. He is the older brother of Nora Beth Grazer (born 1952) and actor/director Gavin Grazer (born 1961). He was raised in Sherman Oaks and Northridge, in Los Angeles's San Fernando Valley.

Grazer's father was Catholic and his mother is Jewish. His parents divorced when he was in high school.  Grazer said "My best buddy, the most important person in my growing up, was my little 4-foot-10 [147 cm] Jewish grandmother, and she'd say, 'In order to get it, you got to do it. No one's going to get it for you, Brian.'"

While in school, Grazer struggled with dyslexia. Grazer got through school by reading other students' papers and arguing his grades with his teachers.

His nephew is actor Jack Dylan Grazer.

Education
Grazer won a scholarship to the University of Southern California (USC) as a psychology major.  He graduated from USC's School of Cinema-Television in 1974.  He then attended USC Law School for one year, but quit in 1975 to pursue a life in Hollywood.

Career
Grazer began his career as a producer developing television projects. While executive-producing TV pilots at Paramount Pictures in the early 1980s, he met current long-time friend and business partner Ron Howard.

He produced his first feature-film, Night Shift, in 1982, directed by Howard. Grazer and Howard teamed up again for Splash in 1984, which Grazer produced and co-wrote.  Splash earned him an Oscar nomination for Best Original Screenplay of 1984. Grazer went on to become an independent producer, teaming up with Tri-Star Pictures to set up plans for a film to star Richard Pryor, and had a continuing relationship with The Walt Disney Studios, and has plans to develop projects for Paramount Pictures.

In November 1985, Grazer and Howard co-founded Imagine Entertainment, which became one of Hollywood's most prolific and successful production companies. Over the years, Grazer's films and TV shows have been nominated for a total of 43 Academy Awards, and 198 Emmys. At the same time, his movies have generated over $15 billion in worldwide theatrical, music, and video grosses.

Grazer's early film successes include Parenthood (1989) and Backdraft (1991). He produced Apollo 13 (1995), for which he won the Producers Guild of America's Daryl F. Zanuck Motion Picture Producer of the Year Award, as well as an Oscar nomination for Best Picture of 1995.

In 1998, he earned two major honors: he was given his own star on the Hollywood Walk of Fame, and made a cameo appearance on the animated series The Simpsons.

In 2001, Grazer won an Academy Award for Best Picture for A Beautiful Mind, which also took home Oscars for Best Supporting Actress (Jennifer Connelly), Best Director (Ron Howard), and Best Adapted Screenplay (Akiva Goldsman).

In 2002, Grazer's 8 Mile was released.  It proved not only to be a huge box office hit, but also the first film with a rap song to win a Best Original Song Oscar, for Eminem's "Lose Yourself".

Grazer also produced the film adaptation of Peter Morgan's play Frost/Nixon (2008). Frost/Nixon was nominated for five Academy Awards, including Best Picture.

Grazer's productions span over a quarter-of-a-century, and almost the full spectrum of movie genres. His comedies include Boomerang (1992), The Nutty Professor (1996), Liar Liar (1997), Life (1999), How the Grinch Stole Christmas (2000), Intolerable Cruelty (2003) and The Spy Who Dumped Me (2018). He has also produced many dramatic thrillers including Inside Man (2006), The Da Vinci Code (2006), American Gangster (2007), Changeling (2008), Angels & Demons (2009), Robin Hood (2010), and Cowboys & Aliens (2011). His recently released films include J. Edgar, the Clint Eastwood-directed biopic of J. Edgar Hoover, starring Leonardo DiCaprio, Tower Heist, starring Ben Stiller and Eddie Murphy, and Restless, directed by Gus Van Sant.

Grazer's Imagine Entertainment's television series include Sports Night, Felicity, Arrested Development, 24 with Kiefer Sutherland, Friday Night Lights, Parenthood, Lie to Me, Empire, Genius: Einstein, Genius: Picasso and Wu-Tang: An American Saga.

Grazer's recent productions includes Rebuilding Paradise, Dads, the 2017 Grammy awarding winning Best Music Film The Beatles: Eight Days a Week (2016), American Made (2017), Rush (2013), directed by Ron Howard, and starring Chris Hemsworth and Daniel Brühl, and Made in America.

Grazer produced Get on Up, a biopic of the legendary "Godfather of Soul" James Brown, and In the Heart of the Sea, directed by Ron Howard and starring Chris Hemsworth, about the American whaleship the Essex.

In 2015, Grazer published his book A Curious Mind: The Secret to a Bigger Life, a #1 NY Times Bestseller, in which he discusses conversations with interesting people, many of whom inspired his work. In 2019, Grazer released his second book Face To Face: The Art of Human Connection.

Personal life
Grazer has been married three times: Corki Corman (1982–92; they had two children; son Riley (born 1986) and daughter Sage (1988)), and novelist and screenwriter Gigi Levangie (1997–2007; they had two sons; Thomas (1999) and Patrick (2004)). In April 2014, Grazer became engaged to Veronica Smiley, chief marketing officer of SBE, a hotel management company. They married on February 20, 2016.

Grazer currently resides in Santa Monica, California.  He also has a home in Hawaii on Sunset Beach, on the Banzai Pipeline on O'ahu's North Shore.
He is a keen user of jump ropes.

Filmography

Film

Music department

Thanks

Television

As an actor

As writer

Thanks

Additional awards
 1998 – Emmy Award for Outstanding Miniseries for From the Earth to the Moon
 2001 – Producers Guild of America's David O. Selznick Lifetime Achievement Award in Theatrical Motion Pictures
 2003 – ShoWest Lifetime Achievement Award
 2004 – Emmy Award for Outstanding Comedy Series for Arrested Development
 2006 – Emmy Award for Outstanding Drama Series for 24
 2007 – Named one of Time Magazine "100 Most Influential People in the World"
 2008 – Emmy Award for Outstanding Children's Animated Program for Curious George
 2009 – Producers Guild of America Milestone Award, together with Ron Howard
 2009 – New York University's Tisch School of the Arts Big Apple Award, together with Ron Howard
 2010 – Simon Wiesenthal Center Humanitarian Award, together with Ron Howard
 2010 – Emmy Award for Outstanding Children's Animated Program for Curious George
 2011 – MPSE 2011 Filmmaker Award
 2017 – Grammy Award for Best Music Film for The Beatles: Eight Days a Week
 2019 – Atlantic Council Global Citizen Award

References

External links 

Imagine Entertainment

1951 births
20th-century American businesspeople
21st-century American businesspeople
American Christians
Film producers from California
American people of Jewish descent
Television producers from California
Businesspeople from Los Angeles
Daytime Emmy Award winners
Golden Globe Award-winning producers
Grammy Award winners
Living people
People from Northridge, Los Angeles
People from Oahu
People from Sherman Oaks, Los Angeles
Producers who won the Best Picture Academy Award
USC Gould School of Law alumni
USC School of Cinematic Arts alumni
Imagine Entertainment
Writers with dyslexia